Johnstone Omurwa (born 8 August 1998) is a Kenyan footballer who plays as a centre-back for Portuguese club Estrela da Amadora and the Kenya national football team.

Club career
After finishing his secondary school education, Omurwa signed for Wazito in 2017, before switching to Mathare United in 2018. He made his debut for the club against Vihiga United in February 2018. In August 2019, Omurwa returned to Wazito. Omurwa was linked with a transfer to Petro Atlético in summer 2020, but the deal fell through.

International career

Youth
Omurwa has played internationally for the Kenya national under-23 team, making his debut against Mauritius in an 2020 Olympics qualification match in November 2018.

Senior
He made his debut for the Kenya national football team on 8 September 2019 in a 1–1 friendly draw with Uganda. He captained the national team for a 1–0 win over South Sudan on 13 March 2021.

References

External links

1998 births
Living people
Kenyan footballers
Kenya international footballers
Association football central defenders
Wazito F.C. players
Mathare United F.C. players
C.F. Estrela da Amadora players
Liga Portugal 2 players
Kenyan expatriate footballers
Expatriate footballers in Portugal
Kenyan expatriate sportspeople in Portugal